Ahmad Thomas (born December 15, 1994) is an American football linebacker for the Montreal Alouettes of the Canadian Football League (CFL). He played college football at Oklahoma.

Professional career

Oakland Raiders
Thomas was signed by the Oakland Raiders as an undrafted free agent on May 5, 2017, but was waived three days later.

Green Bay Packers
On November 29, 2017, Thomas was signed to the Green Bay Packers practice squad. He signed a reserve/future contract with the team on January 4, 2018.

On September 1, 2018, Thomas was waived by the Packers.

Indianapolis Colts
On September 3, 2018, Thomas was signed to the Indianapolis Colts practice squad. He was promoted to the active roster on December 14, 2018.

Thomas was waived/injured during final roster cuts on August 31, 2019, and reverted to the team's injured reserve list the next day. He was waived from injured reserve with an injury settlement on September 11.

Atlanta Falcons
On October 1, 2019, Thomas was signed to the Atlanta Falcons practice squad. He was promoted to the active roster on December 10, 2019.

On August 5, 2020, Thomas was waived by the Falcons.

Montreal Alouettes
Thomas signed with the Montreal Alouettes on January 21, 2021.

References

External links
Oklahoma Sooners bio

1994 births
Living people
American football linebackers
Atlanta Falcons players
Green Bay Packers players
Indianapolis Colts players
Oakland Raiders players
Oklahoma Sooners football players
Players of American football from Miami
Miami Central Senior High School alumni
Montreal Alouettes players
Players of Canadian football from Miami